Kannin Manigal is a 1956 Indian Tamil-language film produced and directed by T. Janakiraman. The film stars M. K. Radha and Padmini.

Cast 
The details are adapted from the database of Film News Anandan.

Male cast
M. K. Radha
N. S. Krishnan
Sundar
A. Karunanidhi

Female cast
Padmini
M. V. Rajamma
T. A. Mathuram
T. P. Muthulakshmi

Production 
Kannin Manigal was produced, written and directed by T. Janakiraman. The dialogues were by A. L. Narayanan and O. Ganapathyappan. Cinematography was handled by T. Janakiraman, and the editing by B. N. Rao. A. P. Chellaiah, D. Sohanlal and S. V. Gopal Rao were in charge of art direction, choreography and photography, respectively.

Soundtrack 
Music was composed by S. V. Venkatraman while the lyrics were penned by Papanasam Sivan, Kambadasan, Subbu. Arumugam, A. Maruthakasi and Kavimani Desigavinayagam Pillai. The song "Kaalam Maari Poche" (sung by N. S. Krishnan) was a satire on modern life and lifestyles, and attained popularity.

Reception 
Kannin Manigal was not a box office success. No print of it is known to survive. This makes it a lost film.

References

External links 

1950s lost films
1950s Tamil-language films
Films scored by S. V. Venkatraman
Indian drama films
Lost drama films
Lost Indian films